Bruno Heck (20 January 1917 in Aalen – 16 September 1989 in Blaubeuren) was a German politician of the Christian Democratic Union (CDU).

Heck was born into a poor Swabian catholic family. He studied philosophy and theology at the University of Tübingen. From 1957 to 1976 Heck was a member of the German Bundestag.

Heck was Minister of Family Affairs and Youth from 1962 to 1968. After the resignation of the FDP ministers in 1966, he additionally headed the Ministry of Housing and Urban Development for a short time.

Heck headed the Konrad Adenauer Foundation from 1968 to 1989. The Bruno Heck Science Prize, awarded biannually by the Konrad Adenauer Foundation, was named in his honor.

References

1917 births
1989 deaths
People from Aalen
Members of the Bundestag for Baden-Württemberg
University of Tübingen alumni
Christian Democratic Union of Germany MEPs
Grand Crosses 1st class of the Order of Merit of the Federal Republic of Germany
Members of the Bundestag for the Christian Democratic Union of Germany
Members of the Bundestag 1972–1976
Members of the Bundestag 1969–1972
Members of the Bundestag 1965–1969
Members of the Bundestag 1961–1965
Members of the Bundestag 1957–1961